Manettia teresitae is a species of plant in the family Rubiaceae. It is endemic to Ecuador.

References

tere
Endemic flora of Ecuador
Endangered flora of South America
Taxonomy articles created by Polbot